Dédougou is a city located in western Burkina Faso. It is the capital city of Mouhoun Province and Boucle du Mouhoun Region. The main ethnic groups are the Marka and the Bwa. The population of Dédougou was 37,793 in 2006; 18,778 were male and 19,015 were female. It is the 10th largest city in Burkina Faso.

Dédougou is also the location of the Festival International des Masques et des Arts (FESTIMA), a biennial international festival celebrating traditional cultural masks.

References
 

Populated places in the Boucle du Mouhoun Region